Banduk Mamburra Wananamba Marika  (13 October 1954 – 12 July 2021) was an artist and printmaker from Arnhem Land, Northern Territory, Australia. She was a member of the Rirratjingu clan of the Yolngu people, whose traditional land is Yalangbara. She was also an environmental activist and leader, and the first Aboriginal person to serve on the National Gallery of Australia's board.

Early life 

Marika was born on 13 October 1954 at Yirrkala, north-east Arnhem Land. Her father, Mawalan Marika (1908–1967), was an artist and he taught her the techniques of bark painting. He was known for his talent and expertise in the technique known as rarrk, or cross-hatching. Her siblings include brother Wandjuk Marika, sister Dhuwarrwarr Marika, Bayngul, and Laklak.

She was educated at the mission at Yirrkala until the age of 15.

Marika was among a small group to be taught and supported by male relatives (including her father) to paint traditional creation stories, which were formerly only allowed to be done by men.

Artistic career 

She moved first to Darwin in 1972 (or 1974?), where she served as Secretary on the Northern Land Council until 1980. During this time she also worked as an Aboriginal field officer, youth worker at the YWCA, and became mother to four children.

She then moved to Sydney in 1980 to pursue her artistic career. She began printmaking in Sydney, which she preferred over painting for the rest of her career. In Sydney she also arranged exhibitions of Aboriginal art. In the mid-1980s Marika was artist-in-residence first at the Canberra School of Art (1985) and then at Flinders University in Adelaide, South Australia (1986).

In 1988, Marika returned to Yirrkala, to take up the role of manager of Buku-Larrnggay Mulka Arts Centre and Museum, and also became member of the Yirrkala-Dhanbul Community Council. She continued to travel for the purpose of artistic collaborations with other printmakers.

Djanda and the Sacred Waterhole (1988), a work commissioned by the Australian National University to commemorate the Australian Bicentenary, was created using linocut on paper, using six colours. It represented a story of great significance to the Rirratjingu clan, involving part of the complex storyline of the Djang'kawu at Yalangbara. She had special rights to use this story by virtue of her land ownership and position in the clan.  The National Gallery of Australia bought one of the prints made by her, while another was purchased for reproduction in a book called Aboriginality.

She was also artist-in-residence at the East Sydney Technical College's school of Art and the Warrnambool TAFE.

Marika incorporated the stories of her clan in her artistic work, such as the Djan'kawu, the Wagilag sisters and the turtle hunters.

Marika, along with the Rirratjingi clan and the Museum and Art Gallery of the Northern Territory (MAGNT), worked together to publish Yalangbara: Art of the Djang'kawu, launched at Government House, Darwin in 2009. The book examines many aspects of Yolngu culture, art, history, tradition, as well as their custodial relationship to land and the issue of copyright. The name derives from the supernatural ancestor siblings, the Djang'kawu, and includes artwork from three generations of Marikas depicting aspects of the story.

The Yalangbara: art of the Djang'kawu touring exhibition, instigated by Marika and developed with the assistance of other family members and MAGNT, opened at the National Museum of Australia from 7 December 2010. This was the first major survey exhibition of the Marika family's work, and covers around 50 named sites in the Yalangbara peninsula that were traversed by the Djang'kawu journey.

In 2017 she and Tiwi Islander Bede Tungutalum were chosen to design a set of four postage stamps with the theme "Art of the North" for Australia Post.

Her work has been shown in America, India, Egypt, Noumea and Singapore, and is represented in the collections of the National Gallery of Australia, Te Papa in New Zealand and the National Gallery of Art in Washington D.C. Five of her prints were shown in the Know My Name exhibition of Australian women artists in 2020-21 at the National Gallery of Australia.

Other work and roles

Film 

She worked as a translator with Film Australia and on the TV series Women of the Sun.

She appeared in several films:

 Banduk (1985), directed by Di Drew;
 Cactus (1986), directed by Paul Cox and starring Isabelle Huppert; and
 Copyrites (1997), a documentary film about Aboriginal copyright (see also below).

She also appeared in Bride for all Seasons! (?) and the docudrama television series Flight into Hell (1985). She features in the ABC Television documentary film, Dream Time, Machine Time (1987) along with poet Oodgeroo Noonuccal, painter Trevor Nickolls and writer Archie Weller.

Indigenous intellectual property 

Banduk said in 1997:

1993–4 Copyright case 

In 1993, it was found that Marika's print Djanda and the Sacred Waterhole (1988) had been reproduced without permission on rugs made in Vietnam and marketed by the Perth-based company Indofurn Pty Ltd. Marika joined with the two other artists whose works had been used, George Milpurrurru and Tim Payungka Tjapangarti, to seek reparations under the Copyright Act 1968 and Trade Practices Act. This was the largest penalty awarded for copyright infringement against Australian artists up to that time, and included compensation for cultural damage stemming from the unauthorised use of sacred imagery. However no damages were ever paid to the artists or their next-of-kin, because the company was declared bankrupt and wound up.

A documentary film called Copyrites (1997), examining copyright of Indigenous peoples' creations, featured Marika and fellow Arnhem land artist Gawirrin Gumana.

Other work on intellectual property 

Marika appeared as a witness in 2019 case against Birubi Art for concealing the fact that their "Aboriginal" artefacts for sale were made in Indonesia, and not by Aboriginal artists. The Federal Court ruled against the company.

Land and language 

In 1999 Marika started working towards attaining heritage listing status for the sacred sites at Yalangbara, which is part of her Rirratjingu clan land. The site was listed in 2003 on the Australian Heritage Commission's Register of the National Estate, based largely on her work done with Mawalan 2 Marika and anthropologist Geoffrey Bagshaw.

She gave the 2010 Eric Johnston Lecture on the subject "Land Management and Cultural Responsibility", a recording being held by the Northern Territory Library, and was head of the Mawalan Gamarrwa Nuwul Association, a local landcare organisation.

In 2014, Marika appeared in an SBS/NITV documentary series on Aboriginal Australian languages, called Talking Language, presented by Ernie Dingo.

Boards 

Marika served on the boards of the National Gallery of Australia and the Museums and Art Galleries of the Northern Territory, and ahe was also a member of the Aboriginal and Torres Strait Islander Arts Board of the Australia Council.

She was a Board Member of the Indigenous Art Code, a group of artists, curators, and arts and legal organisations working to outlaw fake Indigenous art.

Later life and death 

In 2020, she said in a television interview:

Marika died on 12 July 2021, aged 66.

Honours and recognition 

A colour photographic portrait of Marika taken by Anne Zahalka in 1990 is held by the National Portrait Gallery of Australia.

At the 2001 National Indigenous Arts Awards Marika won the Red Ochre Award for her work in the visual arts, the award having been created to recognise "outstanding contribution[s] to the development and recognition of Indigenous arts and culture.

In 2005, she won the bark painting prize at the Telstra National Aboriginal and Torres Strait Islander Art Awards for the painting Yalangbara. She was assisted in painting the work by Boliny and Ralwurrandji Wanambi.

Her book, Yalangbara: Art of the Djang'kawu, was joint winner of the 2009 Chief Minister's Northern Territory Book History Awards.

In April 2018 Marika received an honorary doctorate from Flinders University for "her remarkable contributions as a First Nations artist and cultural advocate for the Yolngu people".

Marika was made an Officer of the Order of Australia (AO) in the 2019 Australia Day Honours for "distinguished service to the visual arts, particularly to Indigenous printmaking and bark painting, and through cultural advisory roles".

In 2020 Marika featured as one of six Indigenous artists in the ABC TV series This Place: Artist Series. The series is a partnership between the Australian Broadcasting Corporation and the National Gallery of Australia, in which the producers travelled to the countries of "some of Australia's greatest Indigenous artists to share stories about their work, their country, and their communities".

Also in 2020, she was honoured as Senior Territorian of the Year.

Works 

 The book Gong-wapitja : Women and art from Yirrkala, northeast Arnhem Land (1998) includes "Story from Banduk".

See also 

 People with the surname Marika

References

Further reading 

 
  Short bios of: Mawalan Marika 1 (c. 1908–1967), Mathaman Marika (c. 1920–1970), Milirrpum Marika (c. 1923–1983), Roy Dadaynga Marika MBE (c. 1925–1993), Wandjuk Djuwakan Marika OBE (1929–1987), Banduk Marika (born 1954), Dhuwarrwarr Marika (born c.1946), Wanyubi Marika (born 1967), Yalmay Gurrwun (Marika) Yunupingu (born 1956), Mawalan Marika 2 (born 1957), Jimmy Barrmula Yunupingu (born 1963) (son of Dhuwarrwarr Marika).

External links

Photos 

 
 

1954 births
2021 deaths
Yolngu people
Officers of the Order of Australia
Artists from the Northern Territory
Australian Aboriginal artists
20th-century Australian artists
21st-century Australian artists
20th-century Australian women artists
21st-century Australian women artists